Is It In is an album by American jazz saxophonist Eddie Harris recorded in 1973 and released on the Atlantic label. It reached number 100 on the Billboard 200 chart.

Reception

The Allmusic review stated "Eddie Harris makes a radical turn toward electronic R&B on this popping, enterprising LP of grooves, humorous one-off vignettes, and other eclectic pursuits. Driven by a standard drum kit and tacky-sounding electric bongos, some of Harris' most irresistible grooves ("Funkaroma," "Look Ahere") can be found here".

Track listing
All compositions by Sara E. Harris except as indicated
 "Funkaroma" (Eddie Harris, Billy James, Ronald Muldrow, Rufus Reid) - 4:58 
 "Happy Gemini" - 3:01 
 "Is It In" (Muldrow) - 3:35
 "It's War" (Harris, James, Muldrow) - 6:20
 "Space Commercial" (Harris, James, Muldrow) - 5:28 
 "Look Ahere" - 3:48 
 "These Lonely Nights" - 5:46 
 "House Party Blues" (Harris, James, Muldrow, Reid) - 8:03 
 "Tranquility & Antagonistic" - 4:15 
Recorded at Paragon Recording Studios in Chicago on December 16 (tracks 1-3, 5 & 7) and December 17 (tracks 4, 6, 8 & 9), 1973

Personnel
Eddie Harris - tenor saxophone, varitone, piano, electric piano, vocals
Ronald Muldrow - guitar, guitorgan
Rufus Reid - electric bass, bass
Billy James - drums, bongos

References 

Eddie Harris albums
1974 albums
Atlantic Records albums